Prof. Anuradha Seneviratna (July 13, 1938 - July 9, 2009) was a renowned Sri Lankan scholar. He wrote many scholarary works and he was a Senior Professor in the Department of Sinhala, University of Peradeniya. He has also worked in University of Colombo and was the Director of the Institute of Aesthetic Studies. He was educated at Dharmaraja College, Kandy.

He was born in Eriyagama, Kandy, on July 13, 1938, and died on July 9, 2009.

Writings
Seneviratna has written nearly 70 books in English and Sinhala, the most famous being;
Purana Anuradhapuraya: Aramika Nagaraya (Ancient Anuradhapura: The Monastic City)
Polonnaruva, Medieval Capital of Sri Lanka: An Illustrated Survey of Ancient Monuments
Sunset in a Valley: Kotmale
Nana Darsana
Anusmrti

External links
www.anuradhaseneviratna.com

Sinhalese writers
Alumni of Dharmaraja College
Alumni of the University of Peradeniya
Academic staff of the University of Colombo
Academics from Kandy
1938 births
2009 deaths
Academic staff of the University of Peradeniya
Sinhalese academics